Tokyo Tapes may refer to:

 The Tokyo Tapes, a 1999 album by Steve Hackett
 Tokyo Tapes (album), a 1978 live album by the Scorpions